Ammi R. R. Butler (September 4, 1821April 4, 1901) was an American lawyer and politician, and was the 23rd Mayor of Milwaukee, Wisconsin, serving from 1876 to 1878.  In historical documents, he's often referred to as "A. R. R. Butler."

Biography

Butler was born in Vermont.  His father was Dr. A. R. R. Butler, a prominent physician in that state.  The year after his birth, they moved to Genesee County, New York, where Butler was educated.  He completed his training in law at Buffalo, and was admitted to the New York State Bar Association in 1846.

He moved to Milwaukee, Wisconsin, later that year, and entered the legal profession.  In 1848, he was elected district attorney for Milwaukee County. He served in that role for the next six years, after which, he returned to private practice.

He was elected on the Democratic Party ticket, in 1865, to represent Milwaukee County in the Wisconsin State Assembly, but was not a candidate for re-election in 1866.  In 1876, he retired from his legal practice.  Two years later, he was elected Mayor of Milwaukee without opposition.

He died in 1901, and was interred at Forest Home Cemetery in Milwaukee.

References

External links
The Political Graveyard

Mayors of Milwaukee
Wisconsin Democrats
1821 births
1901 deaths
Burials in Wisconsin
Place of birth missing
Place of death missing